Transworld Group of companies is a shipping agency, headquartered in United Arab Emirates (Dubai), established by R. Sivaswamy in 1977. Transworld offices are spread across the world – United States, Saudi Arabia, Oman, Qatar, Kuwait, Pakistan, Sri Lanka and on 28 cities of India.

History 
The company was founded in Mumbai in 1977. The activities of the company include – ship management, shipping agencies, feedering, supply chain Management, NVOCC, freight forwarding and container and Bulk carriers. It has a fleet of 27 ships that include 15 feeder vessels and 12 container ships.

Business transformation 

Transworld Group has rebranded Shreyas Relay Systems Ltd and Balaji Shipping Line FZCO, into Avana Logistek Ltd. which takes care of the logistics and supply chain activities of the group. With this, Shreyas Relay Systems Ltd. was converted to Avana Coastal and NVOCC division, Balaji Shipping Line FZCO was transformed to Avana Global.

In association with Birlasoft (KPIT) and Oracle India on the 40th anniversary of the company, Transworld had announced a digital transformation project in the name of Innovation in Motion.

The company bought the vessel 1,608 TEU Mekur Tide and renamed it as OEL Shravan.

Transworld Group acquired MV Suffolk Trader and renamed it MV SSL Krishna on 19 June 2018. It is the 24th addition to the fleet of the group.

Awards 

In 2014, Balaji Shipping Line was recognised as the NVOCC of the Year and Shreyas Shipping and Logistics won ‘Shipping Line of the Year - Coastal Operator’.

In May 2018, Transworld Shipping Agencies was awarded for managing the highest number of container vessels in Cochin.

In June 2018, Shreyas Shipping and Logistics Ltd has won the “Coastal Service Operator of The Year,” and Avana Logistek and Avana Global FZCO won the “NVOCC of The Year” in Coastal Cargo and General Product category.

Management team 
The management team includes the following members –Ramesh S Ramakrishnan who is the chairman, followed by Captain Leslie Reis –Executive Director and Group CEO, Mr. Ritesh S Ramakrishnan – Joint Managing Director, Mrs. Geeta Ramakrishnan – Director Admin & HR and L. B Culas – Group Advisor.

See also
List of largest container shipping companies

References

Logistics companies of the United Arab Emirates
Logistics companies of India
Indian companies established in 1977
1977 establishments in Maharashtra
Container shipping companies